Chiromachla pallescens is a moth of the  family Erebidae. It is found on the Comoros and Madagascar.

References

Nyctemerina
Moths described in 1890